Stephen Sims (11 December 1895 – February 1973) was an English professional footballer who played as a central defender.

He was born in Bedminster, the son of Mary Jane Stenner (1870 - 1906) and Victor Sims (1868 - 1941). His father was the licensee of The Rising Sun Inn, in Bedminster.

References

1895 births
1973 deaths
Footballers from Bristol
English footballers
Association football defenders
Leicester City F.C. players
Bristol Rovers F.C. players
Burnley F.C. players
Weymouth F.C. players
Bristol City F.C. players
Newport County A.F.C. players
English Football League players
Southern Football League players